Ahmet Üstüntaş (born 27 January 1990) is a Turkish biathlete. He represented Turkey at the 2011, 2012, 2013, 2015 and 2016 Biathlon World Championships.

References

External links 
 

1990 births
Living people
Turkish male biathletes
Competitors at the 2015 Winter Universiade